Santa Cruz is an underwater ghost town in the Canadian province of Ontario. It is one of Ontario's Lost Villages, which were permanently flooded by the creation of the St. Lawrence Seaway in 1958.

Families and businesses in Santa Cruz were moved to the new town of Ingleside before the seaway construction commenced.

External links
Ghosttownpix.com - Santa Cruz

The Lost Villages
1958 disestablishments in Ontario
Populated places disestablished in 1958